David Charles Jordan (born October 4, 1949) is a businessman and former political figure in New Brunswick, Canada. He represented Grand Lake in the Legislative Assembly of New Brunswick from 1999 to 2003 as a Progressive Conservative member.

He was born in Minto, New Brunswick, the son of Victor Jordan. Jordan worked in automobile sales and also owned his own business. He was a resident of Ripples. Jordan was defeated when he ran for reelection in 2003.

References 
 New Brunswick MLAs, New Brunswick Legislative Library (pdf)

1949 births
Living people
Progressive Conservative Party of New Brunswick MLAs
21st-century Canadian politicians